The Garda Commissioner – officially known as the Commissioner of An Garda Síochána – is the head of the Garda Síochána, the national police force of Ireland. The Garda Commissioner is appointed by the Government of Ireland (Cabinet), on the recommendation of the Minister for Justice. The Commissioner reports to the Minister for Justice, in charge of the Department of Justice, of which the Garda Síochána is a state agency. The Garda Commissioner sits on the Irish Government's National Security Committee (NSC), and is responsible for Ireland's domestic state security apparatus.

The current Garda Commissioner is Drew Harris, former Deputy Chief Constable of the PSNI, who took office on 3 September 2018.

History

Michael Staines became the first Garda Commissioner in February 1922, when the force was founded as the Civic Guard.

Traditionally, the Commissioner is the highest ranking police officer in the state, however the selection process for the position is now open to candidates from outside the force, outside a law enforcement agency and outside of Ireland.

Nóirín O'Sullivan made history in becoming the first woman to lead the force when she was appointed in November 2014, having already served as the acting Garda Commissioner since March 2014.

Office of the Garda Commissioner
The Garda Commissioner sits at Garda Headquarters, Phoenix Park, Dublin 8 and is supported by a senior management team consisting of two Deputy Commissioners, a Chief Administrative Officer and eight Assistant Commissioners. There are also a number of Executive Directors, each with a different area of responsibility.
 Deputy Commissioner Policing & Security
 Deputy Commissioner Governance & Strategy
 Chief Administrative Officer
 Assistant Commissioner Crime and Security Intelligence Service 
 Assistant Commissioner Organised & Serious Crime 
 Assistant Commissioner Roads Policing & Community Engagement
 Assistant Commissioner Governance and Accountability
 Assistant Commissioner Dublin Metropolitan Region (DMR)
 Assistant Commissioner Eastern Region 
 Assistant Commissioner North Western Region 
 Assistant Commissioner Southern Region
 Executive Director Chief Information Officer
 Executive Director Finance and Services
 Executive Director Human Resources and People Development
 Executive Director Legal and Compliance
 Executive Director Strategy and Transformation
 Executive Director Executive Support & Corporate Services
 Director of Communications
 Garda Chief Medical Officer

List of Garda Commissioners

See also
 Chief of Staff of the Defence Forces (Ireland)

References

Commissioner
1922 establishments in Ireland
 
Department of Justice (Ireland)